John Charles Martin (born November 9, 1943) is an American attorney, who retired as a Judge (and Chief Judge) of the North Carolina Court of Appeals on August 1, 2014.

Born in Durham, North Carolina, Martin earned an undergraduate degree from Wake Forest University in 1965 and his law degree from Wake Forest University School of Law in 1967. He served in the United States Army Military Police as a lieutenant from 1967 to 1969. He then entered private law practice.

Martin served one term on the city council of Durham before becoming a North Carolina Superior Court judge in 1977 by appointment of Governor Jim Hunt. He was elected to the Court of Appeals in 1984, where he served from 1985 to 1988 and from 1993 until 2014. He became chief judge of the court since 2004. He also served as chairman of the state's Judicial Standards Commission from 2001 through 2014. Judge Martin received the North Carolina Bar Association's highest honor, the John J. Parker Memorial Award, in 2013. He was elected president of the Council of Chief Judges of the State Courts of Appeal for the year 2013-2014.

Upon his retirement, Martin was awarded the Order of the Long Leaf Pine by Governor Pat McCrory.

Judge Martin is married to Margaret Rand Martin and has three children, two stepchildren and nine grandchildren.

Notes

External links
Official biography

1943 births
Living people
North Carolina Court of Appeals judges
Wake Forest University alumni
Wake Forest University School of Law alumni
United States Army officers
American military police officers